Warialda Rail is a town in the New England region of New South Wales, Australia.

The name of the local school and the area generally was originally Kelly's Gully, shortened by local residents to "the Gully". The Warialda railway station was located in the village. A recreation reserve was dedicated in the area in 1911 and, in 1913, an estate including allotments near the railway station and farming and grazing land was offered for sale.

Today the village consists of a former hotel, a cluster of houses and a railway yard.

References

Towns in New South Wales
Towns in New England (New South Wales)
Gwydir Shire